The Whangarei Steam and Model Railway Club Inc. was formed in 1978 for the purpose of acquiring, preserving, and operating vintage steam and diesel trains for the education and enjoyment of club members and the general public, the railway operates on Museum Live Days and special occasions over its own  main track. The club has in its care two Peckett steam locomotives (one from 1924 and one from 1955), a Union Foundry, one Bagnall diesel loco, a Drewry and a Price diesel shunters.

Locomotives and Rolling Stock

Locomotives

Trams
Whangarei Steam and Model Railway Club has two  gauge former Lisbon trams 520 and 526 acquired by Dave Harre for Heritage Trams for Henderson, Auckland project he was promoting, having previously stored in Aspen, Colorado for another promoted tramway. One of the Lisbon tram bodies was restored by Mr Harre's group prior to the Henderson project (2003-2013) being abandoned and the trams being acquired by the Whangarei Steam Group, which are converting the two trams to  gauge and building an operating tramway attraction.

References

External links
 

Museums established in 1978
1978 establishments in New Zealand
Heritage railways in New Zealand